Babarcszőlős is a village in Baranya county, Hungary. It is very small in terms of population with only little over 100 people living in the village.

External links 
 Local statistics 

Populated places in Baranya County